Zyta Janina Gilowska  (7 July 1949 – 5 April 2016) was a Polish economist, academic, and politician.

Early life and education
Gilowska was born in Nowe Miasto Lubawskie on 7 July 1949. In 1972, she graduated with a degree in economics from Warsaw University. In 1981, she received her PhD in economics from Maria Curie-Sklodowska University in Lublin.

Career
From 1972 to 1985, Gilowska was a research assistant at Maria Curie-Sklodowska University and later at the same institute, become an associate professor from 1995 to 1999. In 2001, she became full professor at the Catholic University of Lublin. From 1994 to 1996, she was a member of the liberal party, Freedom Union (Unia Wolności). She was the former vice chairman of the Civic Platform party; however, she left the party on 21 May 2005 in protest over accusations by party colleagues of wrongdoing. From 2001 to 2005, she was a Sejm (the lower chamber of the Polish Parliament) deputy.

From 7 January to 23 June 2006, she was deputy prime minister and finance minister in the Law and Justice government under Kazimierz Marcinkiewicz. She was dismissed due to allegations about her communist-era collaboration. Paweł Wojciechowski replaced her as finance minister.

From 22 September 2006 to 16 November 2007, she again was deputy prime minister and finance minister. In October 2006, Gilowska was made the head of Poland's financial supervisory authority and the European Investment Bank governor of Poland.

References

1949 births
2016 deaths
University of Warsaw alumni
People from Nowe Miasto Lubawskie
Academic staff of the John Paul II Catholic University of Lublin
Civic Platform politicians
Members of the Polish Sejm 2001–2005
Finance Ministers of Poland
Deputy Prime Ministers of Poland
Polish Roman Catholics
Women government ministers of Poland
Women members of the Sejm of the Republic of Poland
21st-century Polish women politicians
Polish women academics
Members of the Polish Sejm 2007–2011
Female finance ministers